Baroness Gösta von dem Bussche-Haddenhausen (26 January 1902 – 13 June 1996)  was the mother of Prince Claus of the Netherlands, who was the Prince Consort of Queen Beatrix of the Netherlands, thus making her the mother-in-law of the former Dutch Queen. She is also the paternal grandmother of King Willem-Alexander of the Netherlands, who is the current Dutch King.

Early life
Gösta was born at Döbeln, Kingdom of Saxony, German Empire (now Saxony, Germany), the second child and daughter of Baron George von dem Bussche-Haddenhausen (1869–1923), and his wife, Baroness Gabriele von dem Bussche-Ippenburg (1877–1973). Her father belonged to the Bussche-Haddenhausen branch of the Bussche family, her mother belonged to the Bussche-Ippenburg branch. Both descended from Clamor von dem Bussche (1532–1573).

Her mother was the heir of Dötzingen estate near Hitzacker, which her maternal grandfather had inherited from the counts von Oeynhausen after 1918. Gösta's father was an officer in the Royal Saxon Army. Dötzingen estate later passed on to her brother Baron Julius von dem Bussche-Haddenhausen (1906–1977). After her return from Africa, and her husband's death in 1963, she spent the rest of her life in Dötzingen.

Marriage
Gösta married on 4 September 1924 at Hitzacker to Claus Felix von Amsberg (1890–1963), son of Wilhelm von Amsberg and Elise von Vieregge.

Together they had six daughters and one son:
Sigrid von Amsberg (Hitzacker-Dötzingen, 26 June 1925 – 1 April 2018), married in 1952 to Ascan-Bernd Jencquel (17 August 1913 – 4 November 2003), had issue.
Claus von Amsberg (Hitzacker-Dötzingen, 6 September 1926 – Amsterdam, 6 October 2002), married in 1966 to Beatrix of the Netherlands (b. 31 January 1938), had issue. 
Rixa von Amsberg (Hitzacker-Dötzingen, 18 November 1927 – 6 January 2010), married to Peter Ahrend (17 April 1920 – 2011), no issue.
Margit von Amsberg (Bumbuli, 16 October 1930 – 1988), married in 1964 to Ernst Grubitz (14 April 1931 – 5 June 2009), had issue. 
Barbara von Amsberg (Bumbuli, 16 October 1930), married in 1963 to Günther Haarhaus (22 October 1921 – 9 February 2007), had issue.
Theda von Amsberg (Tanga, 30 June 1939), married in 1966 to Baron Karl  (b. 1933), had issue.
Christina von Amsberg (Salisbury, 20 January 1945), married in 1971 to Baron Hans Hubertus  (b. 1942), had issue.

Life in Africa
Her husband had returned from the Tanganyika Territory, a German colony (now Tanzania) during World War I to become manager of Dötzingen estate in 1917. Shortly after, the estate passed on to the Bussche family. In 1924 he married his employer's daughter, and in 1926, their son Claus war born at Dötzingen. In 1928 the family moved to Tanganyika where they remained during the outbreak of World War II. Her husband was manager of a German-British tea and sisal plantation. Her son was sent back to a German boarding school in 1933, but returned to Africa in 1936; in 1938 Gösta returned to Germany, and Claus was sent to a boarding school in Misdroy, before becoming drafted by the army. Her husband returned to Germany in 1947.

Death
She died, aged 94, in Hitzacker, Germany.

Family relations
Gösta was a second cousin of Dorothea von Salviati (wife of Kronprinz Wilhelm's eldest son Prince Wilhelm of Prussia), both being great-granddaughters of Heinrich von Salviati and Caroline Rahlenbeck. Her younger and only brother Julius (1906-1977) was married to Anna-Elisabeth von Pfuel (1909-2005).

Her family's home, Dötzingen castle, Lower Saxony, had passed to her maternal grandfather Eberhard Friedrich Gustav von dem Bussche-Ippenburg from the counts von Oeynhausen. It was at a dinner party of a distant cousin, the count von Oeynhausen-Sierstorpff in Bad Driburg, on New Year's Eve 1962 that her son Claus met crown-princess Beatrix for the first time, herself also being a cousin of the host: Beatrix' paternal grandmother Armgard von Cramm was a daughter of Baron Aschwin von Sierstorpff-Cramm (1846–1909) and his wife, Baroness Hedwig von Sierstorpff-Driburg (1848–1900), and Armgard von Cramm had first been married to count Bodo von Oeynhausen, before marrying Prince Bernhard of Lippe-Biesterfeld (1872–1934), Beatrix' grandfather; Armgard's elder sister Baroness Hedwig von Sierstorpff-Cramm (1874–1907) was the heir of her mother's family's estate Driburg, and she also married a count von Oeynhausen, Wilhelm Karl Ludwig Kuno Graf von Oeynhausen-Sierstorpff (1860–1922), whose descendants still own Driburg estate.

Ancestry

Notes and sources
thePeerage.com - Gosta Freiin von dem Bussche-Haddenhausen
Die Ahnen Claus Georg von Amsberg, Limburg a.d. Lahn, 1966, Euler, F. W., Reference: 3
Ancestor list HRH Claus Prince of The Netherlands, 1999 and 2003, Verheecke, José, Reference: 3

1902 births
1996 deaths
People from Döbeln
German baronesses
Gosta